Ministry for Primary Industries or Ministry of Primary Industries may refer to:

Ministry for Primary Industries (New Zealand)
Department of Primary Industries (New South Wales)